Romanogobio benacensis is a species of ray-finned fish in the family Cyprinidae.
It is found in Italy and Slovenia.
Its natural habitat is rivers.
It is threatened by habitat loss.

The Latin specific epithet benacensis refers to Lake Garda in northern Italy, which was known to the Romans as 'Benacus'.

References

Romanogobio
Fish described in 1816
Taxonomy articles created by Polbot